The Operations Division   was a former directorate of the Admiralty Naval Staff responsible for the creation and implementation of long-term policy in regards to the composition of all Royal Navy fleets, squadrons and commands and including operational planning and monitoring from 1912 to 1961.

History
The Operations division was established in January 1912 initially as a component part of the new Admiralty War Staff created by the First Lord of the Admiralty Winston Churchill and later the naval staff. It worked closely with the Naval Intelligence Division throughout most of existence and remained until 1961 when it was amalgamated with the Trade Division to create a new Trade and Operations Division. In 1964 the Admiralty Department was abolished, however trade and operations functions continued under the new Naval Staff function within the  Navy Department of the  Ministry of Defence as the Directorate of Naval Operations and Trade.

Responsibilities
The division was chiefly responsible for coordinating the distribution of the British fleet globally and for the general day-to-day, movements of each of the Royal Navy's units as  ordered by the Board of Admiralty, and acted-upon initially by the Chief of the War Staff later Chief of the Naval Staff. However each of the individual Commander-in-Chief's regulated the movements of fleets, flotilla's or squadrons and ships that was under their respective commands.

The division had to ensure that accurate information was constantly available at all times, this included the positions and conditions of all the most important ships. This was done by devising an operational plotting system that enabled the Admiralty to track of all ship movements, all scheduling of re-fits, monitoring fuel levels, and monitoring ammunition storage levels worldwide .

The division would coordinate closely with the Operational Intelligence Center within the Naval Intelligence Division. The Operations Division received intelligence communiques, reviewed the importance of them, then would recommend any necessary remedying actions to be taken. When orders were approved by the Naval Staff they were communicated to all commanding flag officers who would action them.

Directors duties
As of 1918:
 Director: Matters relating to operations, distribution of the Fleet, minelaying, submarines, co-operation of Allied ships, hospital ships and air operations.
 Deputy Director: Matters relating to transports and trade, sailing orders, trials, commissioning orders, all systems of communications, navigation, Board of Trade reports, fisheries.
 Assistant Director (1): Matters relating to foreign stations (except such as are dealt with by D.D.O.D.), entry into defended ports at home and abroad, swept channels at defended ports, traffic regulations, courts martial and courts of enquiry, administration of the Operations Division.
 Assistant Director (2): Matters relating to shore defences and the defence of vulnerable points on shore, at home and abroad. Distribution of Seamen and Marines.Checks all promotions.

Directors of Division

Pre-World War One period

Director of Operations Division
included:
 Captain George A. Ballard, 8 January 1912 – 1 May 1914

World War One period

Director of Operations Division
 Rear-Admiral Arthur Leveson, 1 May 1914 – 16 January 1915
 Rear-Admiral Thomas Jackson, 17 January 1915 – 11 June 1917
 Rear-Admiral George Hope, 11 June 1917 – 9 January 1918

Inter-war period

Director of Operations Division (Home)
Included:
 Captain Dudley Pound, 12 January 1918  – 15 July 1919
 Captain John D. Kelly, 15 July 1919  – 1 April 1920

Director of Operations Division (Foreign)
Included:
 Captain Charles P. R. Coode, 18 January 1918  – 31 March 1920

Director of Operations Division
Included:
 Rear-Admiral John D. Kelly, 1 April 1920  – 15 February 1922
 Captain Henry W. Parker, 1 February 1922
 Captain Wilfred Tomkinson, 21 November 1923–April 1926
 Captain Frank F. Rose, April 1926,–March 1928
 Captain Percy Noble, March, 1928–January 1930
 Captain Dudley Burton Napier North, January, 1930–July 1932
 Captain Charles G. Brodie, July–December 1932
 Captain Francis H. W. Goolden, December, 1932–December 1933
 Captain Henry Pridham-Wippell, December, 1933–December 1935
 Captain Charles H. Knox-Little, December, 1935–July 1938
 Captain Charles M. Blackman, July, 1938–December 1939

World War Two period

Director of Operations Division (Home)
 Captain Cecil H. J. Harcourt, September 1939-February 1941
 Captain Ralph A. B. Edwards, February–December 1941
 Captain John Eccles (Royal Navy officer), December 1941-October 1943
 Captain C. T. Mark Pizey, December 1943-? 1945

Director of Operations Division (Foreign)
 Captain Robert H.Bevan: September 1939-September 1940
 Captain Gerald H. Warner: September 1940-March 1941
 Captain John Terry: March 1941-August 1942
 Captain Angus D. Nicholl: August 1942-August 1944
 Captain Frederick R. Parham: August 1944-January 1947

Post War period

Director of Operations Division
 Captain Charles H. Duffett: January 1947-January 1949
 Captain George B.H. Fawkes: January 1949-July 1951
 Captain Patrick W. Brock: July 1951-October 1953
 Captain John S.S. Litchfield: October 1953-December 1954
 Captain Peter D.H.R. Pelly: December 1954-June 1956
 Captain Walter Evershed: June 1956-June 1957
 Captain Bryan C. Durant: June 1957-January 1959
 Captain Eric V. St.J. Morgan: January 1959-May 1960
 Captain Michael G. Haworth: May 1960-July 1961

Deputy Directors

Deputy Director of Operations
Included:
 Captain Henry W. Grant: July 1917-January 1918
 Captain Bernard St.G. Collard, January 1918-February 1920
 Captain Arthur de K. L. May, January–September 1919
 Captain Hubert H. Holland, September 1919-January 1920
 Captain Sidney R. Bailey, February 1920-March 1921
 Captain Henry G.E. Lane, April 1920-September 1921
 Captain Charles D. Burke, March 1921-April 1922
 Captain Alister F. Beal, September 1921-July 1923
 Captain Wilfred Tomkinson, July–November 1923
 Captain Ambrose M. Peck, November 1923-October 1925
 Captain Frank F. Rose, October 1925-April 1926
 Captain Francis M. Austin, April 1926-August 1927
 Captain Geoffrey Layton, August 1927-August 1929
 Captain Robert R. Turner, August 1929-August 1931
 Captain Francis H.W. Goolden, August 1931-December 1932
 Captain Ernest J. Spooner, December 1932-July 1934
 Captain Ronald W. Blacklock, July 1934-July 1936
 Captain Irving M. Palmer, July 1936-September 1938
 Captain Cecil H.J. Harcourt, September 1938-September 1939

Deputy Director of Operations (Home)
 Captain Ralph A. B. Edwards, October 1939-February 1941
 Captain John F. Stevens, February 1941-August 1942
 Captain Wilfred J.C. Robertson, August 1942-December 1943
 Captain Francis B. Lloyd: December 1943-March 1945
 Captain Christopher T. Jellicoe: March 1945 – 1947

Deputy Director of Operations (Foreign)
Included:
 Captain Gerald H. Warner, February–September 1940
 Captain John Terry, September 1940-March 1941
 Captain William W. Davis, March 1941-January 1942
 Captain Hugh Dalrymple-Smith, January 1942-November 1943
 Captain Ronald G. Mackay, November 1943-March 1946
 Captain Terence A.K. Maunsell, March 1946-March 1948
 Captain William H. Selby, March 1948-April 1950
 Captain Ralph C. Medley, April 1950-April 1952
 Captain John S.M. Richardson, April 1952-January 1954
 Captain Peter Phipps, January 1954-March 1955
 Captain John Plunkett-Cole: March 1955-January 1957
 Captain N.F. Carrington, January 1957-February 1958
 Captain Josef C. Bartosik, February 1958-April 1959
 Captain Richard I. Peek, April 1959-December 1960

Deputy Director of Operations (Foreign and Trade)
 Captain J.A. Murray, December 1960-September 1961
 Captain Roland F. Plugge, September 1961-November 1963

Assistant Directors of Operations
Assistant Director of Operation Division (A.D.O.D.):
 Captain Charles P. R. Coode, 11 June 1917  – 18 January 1918

Second Assistant Directors
 Captain George P. W. Hope, 15 December 1916

Operations division sub staff sections
A more detailed breakdown of the distribution of work allocated within the division to the various staff sections can be seen below as of 1917:

References

Attribution
Primary source for this article is by Harley Simon, Lovell Tony, (2017), Operations Division (Royal Navy), dreadnoughtproject.org, http://www.dreadnoughtproject.org.

Sources
 Archives, The National. "Records of Naval Staff Departments", discovery.nationalarchives.gov.uk. National Archives, 1912-1964.
 Black, Nicholas (2009). The British Naval Staff in the First World War. Woodbridge: The Boydell Press. .
 Naval Staff, Training and Staff Duties Division (1929). The Naval Staff of the Admiralty. Its Work and Development. B.R. 1845 (late C.B. 3013). Copy at The National Archives. ADM 234/434
 Mackie, Colin, (2010-2014), British Armed Services between 1860 and the present day — Royal Navy - Senior Appointments, http://www.gulabin.com/.
 Rodger. N.A.M., (1979) The Admiralty (offices of state), T. Dalton, Lavenham, .
 Smith, Gordon (2014), British Admiralty, Part 2 - Changes in Admiralty Departments 1913-1920, Naval-History.Net.

External links

Admiralty during World War I
Admiralty during World War II
Royal Navy
1912 establishments in the United Kingdom
1963 disestablishments in the United Kingdom
Military history of the United Kingdom during World War II